Sadbhavana Party is a political party in Nepal. The party emerged from a major split in the Nepal Sadbhavana Party (Anandidevi) in the summer of 2007. Laxman Lal Karna was the joint chair of the party.

History 
Initially the party also used the name "Nepal Sadbhavana Party (Anandidevi)", but the party was not recognised by the Election Commission of Nepal by that name. Rajendra Mahato, Minister for Industry and Commerce, resigned from the government in protest. The party was later registered with the Election Commission of Nepal ahead of the 2008 Constituent Assembly election as Sadbhavana Party.

The party was a founding member of the United Democratic Madhesi Front along with Madheshi Janaadhikar Forum, Nepal and Terai Madhesh Democratic Party. The front was a key part of the  second Madhes movement and demanded federalism, proportional representation and population-based constituency demarcation be ensured in the Interim Constitution.

Constituent Assembly and dissolution 
In the elections the party gained nine seats to the 1st Constituent Assembly. Sadbhavana Party joined the government led by CPN (Maoist) with party president Rajendra Mahato joining the cabinet as Minister for Commerce and Supplies. In August 2011, Anil Kumar Jha split the party with five CA members and formed Sanghiya Sadbhavana Party. Later Ram Naresh Rae split the party with two CA members and formed Rastriya Sadbhavana Party.

In the 2013 Constituent Assembly election, the party won six seats to the 2nd Constituent Assembly. The party reformed the United Democratic Madhesi Front with other Madhes-based parties in 2015 against the proposed constitution blaming the major political parties of not implementing agreements between them in the past. The protests continued after the constitution was passed by the house resulting in a prolonged agitation in Madhes.

On 21 April 2017 the party merged with Tarai Madhes Loktantrik Party, Nepal Sadbhawana Party, Terai Madhes Sadbhawana Party, Madhesi Janaadhikar Forum (Republican) and Rastriya Madhesh Samajwadi Party to form Rastriya Janata Party Nepal.

Electoral performance

See also 

 People's Progressive Party

References

Federalist parties in Nepal
2007 establishments in Nepal
2017 disestablishments in Nepal